San José de la Estrella  is an elevated metro station on the Line 4 of the Santiago Metro, in Santiago, Chile. This infill station was built between two operating metro stations on 5 November 2009.

References

Santiago Metro stations
Railway stations opened in 2009